César González (Santo Domingo, 2 October 1982) is a Dutch bobsledder born in the Dominican Republic. Gonzáles started with international bobsleigh competitions in the 2002-03 season. In January 2006 he qualified himself in the team of Arend Glas that several weeks earlier qualified for the 2006 Winter Olympics in Turin. At the qualification play-off (named bob-off) held in Oberhof, Germany he ended up in fourth position behind his opponents, resulting in qualification, but as a reserve bobsledder in case any of the other members faced an injury. Eventually he did not come in action during the Olympics, but he saw his team mates ending up at the 16th position.

External links 
 BSBN.nl

1982 births
Living people
Dutch male bobsledders
Bobsledders at the 2006 Winter Olympics
Olympic bobsledders of the Netherlands
Dutch people of Dominican Republic descent
Sportspeople of Dominican Republic descent
Sportspeople from Santo Domingo